Ghezel Ozan ( / Qezel Owzan) is one of the longest rivers in Iran, originating from the Chehel Cheshmeh Mountains between Saqqez and Divandarreh in Kurdistan Province flowing in northern Iran.  

It flows through Kurdistan Province, Zanjan Province, East Azerbaijan Province, Ardabil Province, and Gilan Province.

It is one of two tributaries forming the Sefid-Rud river, with the Shahrood. The Sefīd-Rūd is a major river and tributary of the Caspian Sea.

Course
The Ghezel Ozan headwaters are in the Zagros Mountains, in a region near Divan Darreh in Kurdistan Province. It runs northeastwards through Miyaneh County in East Azarbaijan and then Khalkhal County in Ardabil Province and then Zanjan County and Tarom County  in Zanjan Province eastwards through the Alborz mountain range in Gilan Province. 

At Rudbar in the southwestern Alborz, it joins the Shah Rud−Shahrood river to form the Sefīd-Rūd river (meaning White River in Persian). Then the Sefid-Rud flows northwards in Gilan Province, through the Alborz range to the Caspian Sea.

Nomenclature
Sometimes the Ghezel Ozan and the Sefīd-Rūd are considered as one river, and the words "Ghezel Ozan" and "Sefid-Rud" are used synonymously for the entire river that flows from the Zagros Mountains in Kordestan Province to the Caspian Sea.

See also

References

Rivers of Kurdistan Province
Rivers of East Azerbaijan province
Landforms of Ardabil Province
Landforms of East Azerbaijan Province
Landforms of Gilan Province
Landforms of Zanjan Province
Alborz (mountain range)
Tributaries of the Sefīd-Rūd
Saqqez County